Diego D'Amico (29 September 1893, Bagheria – 6 August 1947) was an Italian politician. He represented the Christian Democracy in the Constituent Assembly of Italy from 1946 to 1947.

References

External links
https://web.archive.org/web/20131005040133/http://legislature.camera.it/index.asp

1893 births
1947 deaths
People from Bagheria
Christian Democracy (Italy) politicians
20th-century Italian politicians
Members of the Constituent Assembly of Italy
Politicians from the Province of Palermo